Pavlo Savelenko (born 14 July 1993 in Ukraine) is a Ukrainian football midfielder who played for FC Avanhard Kramatorsk in the Ukrainian First League.

Savelenko is a product of the FC Metalurh Zaporizhzhia youth sportive school.

He was called up to play for the 23-man squad of the Ukraine national under-21 football team by trainer Serhiy Kovalets in the Commonwealth of Independent States Cup in January 2014.

References

External links
 
 

Ukrainian footballers
Association football midfielders
1993 births
Living people
FC Metalurh-2 Zaporizhzhia players
FC Kramatorsk players